This is a list of districts in the City of Westminster. Much of Westminster is part of the West End of London and it is also the location of the Theatreland area of West End theatres. Westminster is an amalgamation of three former boroughs.

Paddington
The former borough of Paddington was north of Bayswater Road and west of Edgware Road.

 Bayswater
 Kensal Town (also in Royal Borough of Kensington and Chelsea)
 Maida Vale
 Paddington
 Paddington Green
 Queen's Park (also in London Borough of Brent)
 Westbourne
 Westbourne Green

St Marylebone
The former borough of St Marylebone was north of Oxford Street and east of Edgware Road.

 Fitzrovia (also in London Borough of Camden)
 Lisson Grove
 Portman Estate
 Marylebone
 St John's Wood

Westminster
The former borough of Westminster was south of Bayswater Road and Oxford Street
 Adelphi
 Aldwych
 Belgravia (also in Kensington and Chelsea)
 Charing Cross
 Chinatown
 Covent Garden (also in Camden)
 Devil's Acre 
 Holborn (also in Camden)
 Hyde Park
 Knightsbridge (also in Kensington and Chelsea)
 Mayfair
 Millbank
 Pimlico
 St James's
 Strand
 Soho
 Temple (the statutory Temple area is in the City of London)
 Victoria
 Westminster

 
Lists of places in London
Districts